James Lang (born October 17, 1983) is an American former professional basketball player who played in the National Basketball Association (NBA) for the Washington Wizards.

Professional career
He was selected with the 19th pick of the second round (48th pick overall) of the 2003 NBA draft by the New Orleans Hornets, but was waived in December of that year after back injuries kept him sidelined and after GM Bob Bass proclaimed that Lang did not show "the potential to be put on the active roster". 

Lang attended pre-season camp with the Utah Jazz in 2005 but did not make the team. 

The Toronto Raptors signed Lang to a 10-day contract on March 27, 2006, and he was waived after this contract. Lang had averaged 8.3 points and 5.0 rebounds in 32 games for the Arkansas RimRockers of the NBA Developmental League during the 2006 season. 

He signed two 10-day contracts with the Atlanta Hawks early in the 2006 season but did not see any game action. 

On September 14, 2006, Lang was signed by the Washington Wizards. In July 2007, Lang was released by the Wizards.

Lang's final NBA game was played on January 5, 2007, in a 116–115 win over the Los Angeles Clippers where Lang only played for 42 seconds (substituting at the very end of the 4th quarter for Brendan Haywood) and recorded no stats.

He was in training camp with the Utah Flash of NBA Developmental League gearing up for the 2009-2010 season but the 26-year-old was "waived for medical reasons" on November 18, 2009.

The day after Thanksgiving in 2009, Lang suffered a stroke that left him partially paralyzed.

References

External links
NBA.com Profile - James Lang
basketball-reference.com Profile
D-League profile @ NBA.com
HoopsHype.com Profile

1983 births
Living people
American expatriate basketball people in Israel
American expatriate basketball people in Spain
American men's basketball players
Arkansas RimRockers players
Asheville Altitude players
Basketball players from Birmingham, Alabama
CB Inca players
Centers (basketball)
Israeli Basketball Premier League players
Maccabi Rishon LeZion basketball players
McDonald's High School All-Americans
National Basketball Association high school draftees
New Orleans Hornets draft picks
Sportspeople from Mobile, Alabama
Utah Flash players
Washington Wizards players